Burnet Rhett Maybank Jr. (May 2, 1924 – October 25, 2016) was an American lawyer and politician in the state of South Carolina. He was the son of Governor of South Carolina and Senator Burnet Maybank. Maybank was educated at The Citadel, The Military College of South Carolina from 1941 to 1942, and served in World War II with the United States Army Air Corps, participating in 31 combat missions over Western Europe. He later attended the University of South Carolina, graduating with a LL.B. in 1950. He was also admitted to the South Carolina bar that same year and practiced law in Greenville, South Carolina and Charleston, South Carolina. Maybank served as a Democrat in the South Carolina House of Representatives from 1953 to 1958. He later served as Lieutenant Governor of South Carolina under governor Fritz Hollings from 1959 to 1963.

Later, Maybank switched to the Republican Party. He served on the Charleston County Council until his retirement. Maybank died on October 25, 2016 at the age of 92. He married Marion Mitchell on January 22, 1949 and has two children, Marion and Burnet Rhett III.

References

1924 births
2016 deaths
South Carolina Democrats
South Carolina Republicans
County council members in South Carolina
Members of the South Carolina House of Representatives
Lieutenant Governors of South Carolina
Politicians from Charleston, South Carolina
The Citadel, The Military College of South Carolina alumni
University of South Carolina alumni
South Carolina lawyers
United States Army Air Forces soldiers
Lawyers from Charleston, South Carolina
20th-century American lawyers